Surf Office is a European-based facilitator of remote working retreats for companies. They currently have shared living and working spaces throughout Portugal and Spain with locations in Lisbon, Barcelona, Malaga, Gran Canaria, and Madeira.  Surf Office currently has plans to open more locations throughout Europe, and then hopes to expand out of Europe. Surf Office currently has just over 10 employees based throughout Europe.

Surf Office was founded in 2013 by Peter Fabor, as an experimental side project, with the first location being established in Gran Canaria, Spain.

Surf Office host company retreats. Fabor has also said that Surf Office may consider expanding their offerings to include individuals again, but they have no plans for this in the immediate future.

Surf Office has also been featured in multi-national press mediums, including The Guardian, The New York Times, Buzz Feed, The Huffington Post, Tech Insider, Time Out London, and Forbes.

References

Telecommuting
Freelance marketplace websites
Online marketplaces of Spain